An American Girl: Lea to the Rescue is a 2016 family-drama film starring Maggie Elizabeth Jones in the title role, Hallie Todd, Laysla De Oliveira, Storm Reid, Sean Cameron Michael, Rehane Abrahams and Connor Dowds in supporting roles. The film was directed by Nadia Tass, who also previously directed the first two films in the American Girl franchise.

The film focuses on 2016 Girl of the Year Lea Clark, as she takes a trip to Brazil and finds a way to save her brother who has disappeared mysteriously.

Premise
Born for adventure, Lea Clark heads deep into the Brazilian rainforest, where her most exciting story awaits.

Cast
 Maggie Elizabeth Jones as Lea Clark
 Hallie Todd as Carol Clark
 Storm Reid as Aki
 Laysla De Oliveira as Paula Ferreira
 Connor Dowds as Zac Clark
 Sean Cameron Michael as Ricardo Carvalho
 Rehane Abrahams as Officer Adriana Costa
 Kevin Otto as Rick Clark
 Joe Vaz as Miguel Belo
 Peter Butler as Bruno
 Mokgethoa Tebeila as Abby
 Aimee Valentine as Aki's Mother
 Lee Raviv as Zoe, the wide eyed girl
 Ray Crosswaite as Jimmy
 Farouk Valley-Omar as Tribal Elder

Release
The direct-to-video film was released on video-on-demand services on May 31, 2016, and was released for DVD and Blu-ray on June 14.

Notes
The film, despite being set in Brazil, was filmed in South Africa.

References

External links
 
 

Films based on American novels
2010s English-language films
Films set in Brazil
American children's films
Lea to the Rescue
Films shot in South Africa
American adventure films
Universal Pictures direct-to-video films
2010s American films